Christopher Orr is a Paralympic medalist from New Zealand who competed in alpine skiing.  He competed in the 1984 Winter Paralympics where he won a silver medal in downhill.

References

External links 
 
 

Alpine skiers at the 1984 Winter Paralympics
Paralympic silver medalists for New Zealand
Living people
Medalists at the 1984 Winter Paralympics
New Zealand male alpine skiers
Year of birth missing (living people)
Paralympic medalists in alpine skiing
Paralympic alpine skiers of New Zealand